Oh! Brothers is a South Korean rock band that formed in 1998. The band was originally named the 'Orgasm Brothers', but prior to debuting in 2001 had been renamed to its current name. Since 1998, the band has performed in clubs in the Hongdae area, as well as on the streets and in subway stations.

Members

Current members 
 Lee Seong-mun (이성문), bass guitar
 Choi Seong-su (최성수), vocal
 Kim Jeong-wung (김정웅), guitar
 Lee Seong-bae (이성배), saxophone
 Ahn Tae-joon (안태준), drums

Former members 
 Lim Jan-heui (임잔희), guitar
 Ju Hyeon-cheol (주현철), guitar, vocal
 Yun Ju-hyeon (윤주현), drums

Discography

Major releases 
 Myeongnang Twist (The Merry Twist), released in July 2001
 Let's-A-Go-Go, released in January 2002
 One & Two & Rock & Roll, released on July 9, 2004
 How Much Gettin' Very Hot?, released on August 9, 2007

Singles, etc. 
 hippin' hopping' twistin' , released in 2001 (in cassette tape only)
 Kick Off The Jams (Korea/Japan Independent Label Festival 2001), released in 2001
 New Attack 2002, released in 2002
 Heuihanhage Nuni Majeun Geunyeo (Feat. Giggles) (Somehow Strangely She And I Got A Crush On Each Other), released on October 24, 2006
 To You Sweetheart Aloha (tribute to Hula Girls, a 2006 Japanese film starring Yū Aoi), released on February 7, 2007

Notes and references

External links 
  Oh! Brothers official website
  Oh! Brothers Rock'n'roll High Lifestyle Jijon (Official fansite at Cyworld)
  Oh! Brothers Rock'n'roll High Lifestyle (Official fansite at Daum cafe)

South Korean rock music groups
Musical groups established in 1998